Tim van Berkestijn, better known by his stage name Benny Sings, is a Dutch pop musician, songwriter, and producer from the Netherlands. Since 2003, he has released nine studio albums, including his most recent album, 2021's Beat Tape II on Stones Throw Records. He has since collaborated with many artists worldwide, like Mac DeMarco, Mocky, and Rex Orange County.

Biography 
Tim van Berkestijn was born in 1977 and raised in Dordrecht, a city in the Western Netherlands. He formed his first band, the Loveboat, in high school. He attended the Royal Conservatory of The Hague, where he studied sonology. He made beats under the name Benny V Kreamtits before changing his name to Benny Sings.
 
In 1999, Berkestijn adopted the stage name Benny Sings when he joined the Dutch hip hop group Abstract Dialect as a bassist. During this period, he also worked with hip hop collective De Toffen and the soul group Heavenly Social.

In 2003, Sings released his first solo album, Champagne People, which did well in the Netherlands and Europe. During the 2010s, Sings gained more attention in the United States. In 2017, he helped pen the Rex Orange County single "Loving Is Easy". In 2018, he joined the roster of American record label Stones Throw.

Beyond his solo career, Sings has collaborated with, written for, and produced many notable artists, including Mayer Hawthorne, Rex Orange County, Free Nationals, GoldLink, Mac DeMarco and Tom Misch. He also composed songs for the anime Carole & Tuesday.

In 2022, Benny Sings co-produced Rex Orange County's album Who Cares?, which debuted at number 5 on the Billboard 200. He released the song The Only One on October 26, 2022. His new album "Young Hearts" is set to release on March 24, 2023.

Discography

Studio albums

EPs

Live albums

Compilations

As featured artist 
C-Mon – "Beggars for Sun" (Cereal, 2008)
Che Grand – "Soraya's Jam" (Everything's Good Ugly, 2009)
Knobsticker – "Hypothetical_Theoretical" (Forest Fruit, 2009)
Scallymatic Orchestra – "All I Can Give" (Annie Get Your Gun, 2009)
Kan Sano – "Go Nowhere" (2.0.1.1, 2014)
Data – "Don't Sing" (Don't Sing, 2015)
Koffie – "Hard Times" (Huntu, 2017)
Instupendo – "Homme" (Friend of a Friend, 2017)
Rex Orange County – "Loving is Easy" (2017)
Onelight – "Aldehyde" (Vanderlay, 2018)
Tuxedo – "Toast 2 Us" (Tuxedo III, 2019)
Shuko & The Breed – "Life in Los Angeles" (Dippin''', 2019)
Blackwave. – "The Antidote" (Are We Still Dreaming?, 2019)
Free Nationals – "Apartment" (Free Nationals, 2019)
Les Cooles de Ville – "Starr People" (L.C.D.V., 2019)
Intellextual – "Popstar" (Intellextual, 2019)
Gosto – "The Other Way" (2019)
Aaron Taylor – "Shooting Star" (Icarus, 2020)
M.I.L.K. – "Prisoner" (Always Summer Somewhere, 2020)
Yaffle – "The Child Inside" (Lost, Never Gone, 2020)
Darius - "RISE" (Utopia'', 2021)

References

External links
 
 
 

1977 births
Living people
Dutch pop singers
People from Dordrecht
Sonar Kollektiv artists
Royal Conservatory of The Hague alumni
21st-century Dutch singers